1494 Savo, provisional designation , is a stony background asteroid from the inner region of the asteroid belt, approximately 8 kilometers in diameter. Discovered by astronomer Yrjö Väisälä at the Turku Observatory in 1938, the asteroid was later named after the Finnish region of Savonia.

Discovery 

Savo was discovered on 16 September 1938, by Finnish astronomer Yrjö Väisälä at the Iso-Heikkilä Observatory near Turku, Finland. Two nights later, it was independently discovered by German astronomer Arno Arthur Wachmann at the Bergedorf Observatory in Hamburg. However, the Minor Planet Center only acknowledges the first discoverer.

Orbit and classification 

Savo is an asteroid of the main belt's background population that does not belong to any known asteroid family. It orbits the Sun in the inner asteroid belt at a distance of 1.9–2.5 AU once every 3 years and 3 months (1,184 days). Its orbit has an eccentricity of 0.13 and an inclination of 2° with respect to the ecliptic. The body's observation arc begins with its official discovery observation at Turku in September 1938.

Physical characteristics 

In the SMASS classification, Savo is an Sa-subtype that transitions from the stony S-type to the A-type asteroids.

Rotation period 

In August 2006, a rotational lightcurve of Savo was obtained from photometric observations by Czech astronomer Petr Pravec at Ondřejov Observatory. Lightcurve analysis gave a well-defined rotation period of 5.35011 hours with a brightness amplitude of 0.52 magnitude, indicative for a non-spherical shape. Follow up observations at the Calvin College Observatory in 2007 and 2008, gave three nearly identical periods of 5.35020, 5.35031 and 5.35062 hours with an amplitude between 0.44 and 0.63.

Poles 

The asteroid's lightcurve has also been modeled twice. In 2011, the first modelling used photometric data from the AstDyS database and the Uppsala Asteroid Photometric Catalogue, and found two spin axis of (248.0°, −68.0°) and (83.0°, −66.0°) in ecliptic coordinates (λ, β). A refined modeling in 2016, using the Lowell Photometric Database gave two poles of (50.0°, −65.0°) and (233.0°, −68.0°) in ecliptic coordinates. Also, both studies found a concurring period of 5.35059 hours.

Diameter and albedo 

According to the surveys carried out by the Japanese Akari satellite and the NEOWISE mission of NASA's Wide-field Infrared Survey Explorer, Savo measures between 7.80 and 9.23 kilometers in diameter and its surface has an albedo between 0.173 and 0.349. The Collaborative Asteroid Lightcurve Link assumes a standard albedo for stony asteroids of 0.20 and calculates a diameter of 10.30 kilometers based on an absolute magnitude of 12.3.

Naming 

This minor planet was named after Finnish historical province of Savonia. The official  was published by the Minor Planet Center in January 1956.

Notes

References

External links 
 Asteroid Lightcurve Database (LCDB), query form (info )
 Dictionary of Minor Planet Names, Google books
 Asteroids and comets rotation curves, CdR – Observatoire de Genève, Raoul Behrend
 Discovery Circumstances: Numbered Minor Planets (1)-(5000) – Minor Planet Center
 
 

001494
Discoveries by Yrjö Väisälä
Named minor planets
001494
19380916